37th Battalion may refer to:

 37th Battalion (Australia)
 37th Battalion (New Zealand)
 37th Battalion (Northern Ontario), CEF